Orthogoniosaurus (meaning "straight angled lizard", referring to the straight posterior edge of its type tooth) was a genus of theropod dinosaur from the late Maastrichtian-age Upper Cretaceous Lameta Formation of Jabalpur, India.  It is based on one small, fragmentary tooth (preserved section 27 mm (1.1 in) long).

Because it is the earliest published name for a Lameta theropod, it has sometimes been used as a synonym for other contemporaneous theropods, such as Indosaurus and Indosuchus.  As a tooth taxon, however, such usage has been discouraged.  Ralph Molnar in 1990 noted that the form of the tooth was most like teeth from the rear of theropod jaws, although the lack of serrations on the leading edge was unusual.  In the most recent review, it was considered to be a dubious ceratosaurian.

"Massospondylus" rawesi, another tooth taxon, but from probable Upper Triassic rocks, is sometimes given as a second species of this genus, but it may not be dinosaurian, and could be substantially older.

See also
 Timeline of ceratosaur research

References

Ceratosaurs
Late Cretaceous dinosaurs
Dinosaurs of India and Madagascar
Fossil taxa described in 1931